Strahinja Karišić (born 3 July 1997) is a Serbian professional footballer who plays as a midfielder for OFK Bačka.

Career
In 2015, Karišić joined the youth academy of Spanish La Liga side Granada.

He was included on the extended roster of Watford for the 2017–18 Premier League as an under-21 player, but did not make any appearances or call-ups to the senior squad.

In 2017, he joined the youth academy of Fluminense in Brazil on loan, but left that December.

In mid-2018, his rights were acquired by Partizan. For the 2018–19 season, Karišić was loaned to Serbian second division club Teleoptik, where he made 20 league appearances and scored 1 goal.

In 2019, he signed for Voždovac in the Serbian top flight.

In 2020, Karišić signed for Slovenian second division team Primorje.

References

External links
 
 Strahinja Karišić at playmakerstats.com

Living people
1997 births
Sportspeople from Pristina
Serbian footballers
Association football midfielders
Club Recreativo Granada players
FK Rad players
FK Teleoptik players
FK Voždovac players
FK Sinđelić Beograd players
ND Primorje players
OFK Žarkovo players
OFK Bačka players
Segunda División B players
Serbian SuperLiga players
Serbian First League players
Slovenian Second League players
Serbian expatriate footballers
Expatriate footballers in Spain
Serbian expatriate sportspeople in Spain
Expatriate footballers in England
Serbian expatriate sportspeople in England
Expatriate footballers in Brazil
Serbian expatriate sportspeople in Brazil
Expatriate footballers in Slovenia
Serbian expatriate sportspeople in Slovenia